This is a list of airports in Samoa, sorted by location.

Samoa, the Independent State of Samoa (formerly known as Western Samoa and German Samoa), is a country governing the western part of the Samoan Islands in the South Pacific Ocean. The country is located west of the international date line (since 2011) and south of the equator, about halfway between Hawai‘i and New Zealand in the Polynesian region of the Pacific Ocean. The total land area is 2934 km2 (1133 sq mi), consisting of the two large islands of Upolu and Savaii which account for 99% of the total land area, and eight small islets: three in the Apolima Strait (Manono Island, Apolima and Nu'ulopa), the four Aleipata Islands off the eastern end of Upolu (Nu'utele, Nu'ulua, Namua, and Fanuatapu), and one off the south coast of Upolu (Nu'usafe'e).  The main island of Upolu is home to nearly three-quarters of Samoa's population, as well as the capital city of Apia.



Airports 

Airport names shown in bold have scheduled passenger service on commercial airlines.

See also 
 Transport in Samoa
 List of airports by ICAO code: N#NS - Samoa
 Wikipedia: WikiProject Aviation/Airline destination lists: Oceania#Samoa
(Henrietta Matuauto was the first pilot who landed the very first plane at the Fagalii Airport in 2003.)

References 
 
  - includes IATA codes
 Great Circle Mapper: Airports in Samoa - IATA and ICAO codes
 World Aero Data: Airports in Western Samoa
 Aircraft Charter World: Airports in Western Samoa

Samoa
 
Airports
Samoa